Kuppiyawatta East Grama Niladhari Division is a Grama Niladhari Division of the Thimbirigasyaya Divisional Secretariat  of Colombo District  of Western Province, Sri Lanka .

Panchikawatte, St. John's College, Colombo, Nalanda College, Colombo, Dharmasoka College, Ananda College, Dematagoda, Veluwana College, Department of Prisons, 2012 Welikada prison riot and Welikada Prison  are located within, nearby or associated with Kuppiyawatta East.

Kuppiyawatta East is a surrounded by the Maligawatta East, Maligawatta West, Maligakanda, Borella North, Wanathamulla and Kuppiyawatta West  Grama Niladhari Divisions.

Demographics

Ethnicity 

The Kuppiyawatta East Grama Niladhari Division has a Sinhalese plurality (44.5%), a significant Moor population (38.0%) and a significant Sri Lankan Tamil population (14.4%) . In comparison, the Thimbirigasyaya Divisional Secretariat (which contains the Kuppiyawatta East Grama Niladhari Division) has a Sinhalese majority (52.8%), a significant Sri Lankan Tamil population (28.0%) and a significant Moor population (15.1%)

Religion 

The Kuppiyawatta East Grama Niladhari Division has a Buddhist plurality (42.5%), a significant Muslim population (39.9%) and a significant Hindu population (12.0%) . In comparison, the Thimbirigasyaya Divisional Secretariat (which contains the Kuppiyawatta East Grama Niladhari Division) has a Buddhist plurality (47.9%), a significant Hindu population (22.5%) and a significant Muslim population (17.4%)

Grama Niladhari Divisions of Thimbirigasyaya Divisional Secretariat

Gallery

References